Beatriz Bilbao (born 8 December 1951) is a Venezuelan composer. She was born in Caracas, Venezuela, and studied piano with Judith James and Gerty Haas, composition with Modesta Bor, and conducting with Alberto Grau and Gonzalo Castellanos in Venezuela. She continued her studies at Indiana University Music School with Frederick Fox, Juan Orrego Salas and John Eaton and at the New England Conservatory of Music and the Cluj Napoca Conservatory in Romania.

After completing her studies, Bilbao worked as a composer and music teacher. In 1991 she took a teaching position at the Instituto Universitario de Estudios Musicales (IUDEM) in Caracas and from 2001–02  served as director of the Ministry of Culture's Prudencio Esáa Music School. Her music has been performed internationally.

Honors and awards
1995 Ramón Delgado Palacios National Prize for her piano work Secuencias Mestizas
1994 Munizipal Prizes for Trilogía Aborígen and Four Color Dances
1989 First Symphonic Composition Contest Seguros la Previsora prize for Concierto de las Tres Esferas

Works
Bilbao works with both electronic media and acoustic instruments, composing for orchestra, chamber ensembles, electroacoustics, electronics, vocal and piano performance. Selected works include:
Medaka
Secuencias Mestizas III
La Saeta 1995
La Passionaria
La Fiesta de San Juan
Siete Luces for synthesizers and orchestra
Triángulo Mágico for two synthesizers and symphonic orchestra, with Ricardo Teruel
Trilogía Aborígen, vocal work
Four Color Dances for piano
Concierto de las Tres Esferas for two synthesizers and orchestra

Her music has been recorded and issued on CD, including:
Espirales de Prana Label: sin contrato discográfico

References

1951 births
Living people
20th-century classical composers
Venezuelan music educators
Venezuelan women classical composers
Musicians from Caracas
Indiana University alumni
New England Conservatory alumni
Women music educators
Venezuelan electronic musicians
20th-century women composers